The Sellbytel Group is a Germany headquartered global outsourcing company specializing in sales, service, support, human resources, training, back office and home office solutions. In Germany, the company is based in Nuremberg, Munich, Erfurt, Duesseldorf, Meerbusch, Schwalbach, Boblingen and Berlin. 

The SELLBYTEL Group has 62 international sites including Paris, Lyons, Grenoble, Barcelona, Lisbon, Madrid, Prague, Warsaw, Moscow, Bratislava, Johannesburg, Bangalore, London, Valencia, Toronto, Singapore, Kuala Lumpur, Seoul, Sydney, Bangkok, Hanoi, Jakarta, Manila, Lagos, Nairobi, Cairo and San Francisco.

History 

In 1988 Michael Raum founded the SELLBYTEL Group GmbH with headquarters in Nuremberg, Germany. In 1998, Raum founded the first affiliated company in France.

In 2000 the affiliated company HELPBYCOM European Help Desk Services GmbH was founded to expand the product portfolio in the range of help desk solutions. In 2001 SELLBYTEL Group opened a new site in Barcelona.

In 2003 SELLBYTEL Group spread its business activities and founded the affiliated company LIVINGBRANDS GmbH. Two years later the outsourcing specialist entered the market of pharma communication with its brand MEDEXPERTS and in 2007, the HR company RIGHTHEAD was founded. The SELLBYTEL Group continued its expansion by founding another location in Toronto to cover the entire North American market. In the same year, SELLBYTEL founded a second branch in Berlin. In November 2010, the outsourcing specialist expanded into Asia and set up an office in Singapore.

In 2011 locations in Nairobi, Lagos, Dakar, Jakarta, Manila, Bangkok and Hanoi were established. Moreover, the SELLBYTEL Group took over training specialist aha! TALENTEXPERTS. In 2013, the company added another location in San Francisco, California. In 2018 the SELLBYTEL opened a new location in San Juan, Puerto Rico and founded INVIRES, its subsidiary. In 2018 the SELLBYTEL Group became part of the Webhelp Group.

References

Information technology consulting firms of Germany
International information technology consulting firms
International management consulting firms
Call centre companies
Companies based in Nuremberg
Outsourcing companies